The third season of Without a Trace premiered September 23, 2004 on CBS and concluded May 19, 2005. There are 23 episodes in this season.

The third season of Without a Trace was released on DVD in region 1 on May 15, 2012, in region 2 in Germany on July 14, 2006, and in the UK on July 24, 2006. In region 4, the third season was released on May 2, 2007.

Cast
 Anthony LaPaglia as John Michael Malone
 Poppy Montgomery as Samantha Spade
 Marianne Jean-Baptiste as Vivian Johnson
 Enrique Murciano as Danny Taylor
 Eric Close as Martin Fitzgerald

Episodes

References

Without a Trace seasons
2004 American television seasons
2005 American television seasons